Vosud or Vásuðr ("Wet and Sleety"), a jötunn from Norse mythology, was the father of Vindsvalr and grandfather of winter (Vetr). He is seen as disagreeable and the personification of the icy wind.

References

Jötnar
Personifications in Norse mythology
Wind gods